The Liquid Amber EP is an EP by American music producer DJ Shadow. It was released for streaming on August 12, 2014 through DJ Shadow's official website and will be released on DJ Shadow's new record label, Liquid Amber. The track "Ghost Town" was also released for free download.

Background
The EP features two original songs and a Machinedrum remix of the track "Six Days", from The Private Press (2002). Both songs were written, programmed, and mixed by DJ Shadow. DJ Shadow described the EP as "the opening salvo in what I hope is a long string of music, by myself and others, on my new imprint." He also stated that the track "Ghost Town" was inspired by "many of the micro-genres within the future bass umbrella."

Track listing
 "Ghost Town" – 3:52
 "Mob" – 3:08
 "Six Days" (Machinedrum remix) – 4:21

Personnel
 DJ Shadow – writing, composition, production, engineering
 Machinedrum – remixing (3)

References

External links
 DJ Shadow official website

2014 EPs
DJ Shadow albums
Self-released EPs